Quinton Lamar Spain (born August 7, 1991) is an American football guard who is currently a free agent. He was signed by the Tennessee Titans as an undrafted free agent in 2015. He played college football at West Virginia.

Professional career

Tennessee Titans

2015 season

Spain signed with the Tennessee Titans as an undrafted free agent following the 2015 NFL Draft. He made the Titans final roster as a rookie, playing in seven games with six starts at guard. The Titans finished with a league-worst 3-13 record.

2016 season

In 2016, Spain won the starting left guard spot and started 13 games, missing 3 due to injury. The 2016 Titans offensive line was heralded as one of the best in the league, which blocked for DeMarco Murray as he led the AFC in rushing yards. The Titans finished with a 9-7 record.

2017 season

Spain started the 2017 season as the Titans' starting left guard. He started 14 games for the Titans and missed two, who finished with another 9-7 record and qualified for the playoffs. He started his first two postseason contests, playing in the Titans' upset comeback win against the Kansas City Chiefs, blocking for Derrick Henry as he accounted for a then-franchise record 191 total yards, and then the Titans' 35-14 loss to the New England Patriots in the Divisional round.

2018 season

In the 2018 offseason, the Titans placed a tender on Spain, who was a restricted free agent. Spain signed his one-year tender on April 3, 2018. He started 15 games at left guard in 2018, missing the Titans Week 7 London Game against the Los Angeles Chargers as the Titans finished with another 9-7 record. He notably blocked for Derrick Henry as he was named AFC Offensive Player of the Month for December.

Buffalo Bills

On April 3, 2019, Spain signed a one-year contract with the Buffalo Bills. During the 2019 season, Spain would start in all 16 games for the Bills, playing every offensive snap, committing only four penalties and not allowing a single sack.  The Bills finished with a 10-6 record, qualifying for the playoffs where he started for the Bills' wild card loss to the Houston Texans.

On March 17, 2020, Spain signed a three-year, $15 million contract extension with the Bills. He started the first two games at left guard before being benched in favor of Cody Ford and Brian Winters. He was released on October 21, 2020.

Cincinnati Bengals
On October 30, 2020, Spain was signed to the Cincinnati Bengals' practice squad. He was elevated to the active roster on October 31, November 14, and November 21 for the team's weeks 8, 10, and 11 games against the Tennessee Titans, Pittsburgh Steelers, and Washington Football Team, and reverted to the practice squad after each game. He was signed to the active roster on November 23, after starting the previous two games.

Spain re-signed on a one-year contract with the Bengals on March 30, 2021.

Spain was the starting left guard for Cincinnati in Super Bowl LVI, where, on what would prove to be the Bengals' final offensive play of the game, Spain missed the block on Los Angeles Rams DT Aaron Donald, allowing him to nearly sack quarterback Joe Burrow, forcing a last ditch pass towards running back Samaje Perine which would fall short, resulting in a Bengals loss. After the conclusion of the game, Spain received a substantial amount of backlash across social media platforms.

Personal life
Spain has hosted a Football Skills Camp the last three years in his hometown of Petersburg, Virginia. During his camp on July 1, 2017, Petersburg Mayor Sam Parham gave Spain a proclamation and officially declared it Quinton Spain Day.

References

1991 births
Living people
Sportspeople from Petersburg, Virginia
Players of American football from Virginia
American football offensive guards
West Virginia Mountaineers football players
Tennessee Titans players
Buffalo Bills players
Cincinnati Bengals players